Urmas Klaas (born on 17 March 1971 Räpina) is an Estonian politician. Since 2014 he is the mayor of Tartu. Since 2006 he belongs to Estonian Reform Party.

1998 he graduated from University of Tartu.

2004-2007 Ummi was elder of Põlva County.

He has been member of the Riigikogu since 2007.

References

1971 births
Estonian Reform Party politicians
Living people
Mayors of Tartu
Members of the Riigikogu, 2007–2011
Members of the Riigikogu, 2011–2015
Members of the Riigikogu, 2019–2023
Members of the Riigikogu, 2023–2027
People from Räpina
University of Tartu alumni